Eline Nygaard Riisnæs (5 July 1913 – 3 February 2011) was a Norwegian pianist and musicologist at UiO, mother of the pianist and piano pedagog Anne Eline Riisnæs (1951-), and the saxophonists Knut Riisnæs (1945-) and Odd Riisnæs (1953-).

Career 
Nygaard Riisnæs was born in Sandefjord. She studied piano in Oslo with pianists Dagmar Walle-Hansen and Nils Larsen, and in Stockholm with the great Russian pianist Simon Barrere. She debuted in 1939 and played the year after with Oslo Philharmonic Orchestra. In 1949 she toured the United States with among others Kari Frisell. In Norway she had extensive concert collaboration with NRK. She taught Musicology at University of Oslo, and was attached to the University as a lecturer in 1971, associate professor from 1981 to 1983. She died in Oslo, aged 97.

Honors 
"Lindemanprisen" 1979
Kongens fortjenstmedalje i gull (1983)

References

External links 

1913 births
2011 deaths
Musicians from Sandefjord
Academic staff of the University of Oslo
Norwegian women pianists
Norwegian musicologists
Women musicologists
Norwegian women academics
20th-century pianists
Women classical pianists
20th-century Norwegian women
20th-century women pianists